Rutledge is a city in Morgan County, Georgia, United States. Founded in 1871, the city had a population of 871 at the 2020 census, up from 781 in 2010.

History
Rutledge had its start in the 1840s when the railroad was extended to that point. The Georgia General Assembly incorporated Rutledge as a town in 1871.

Geography
Rutledge is located in western Morgan County at  (33.625723, -83.610899). U.S. Route 278 passes through the south side of the city, leading east  to Madison, the county seat, and west  to Covington.

The south side of the city is drained by Rice Creek, a tributary of Big Indian Creek, which flows southeast to the Little River. The north side of the city drains to Hard Labor Creek, which flows east to the Apalachee River. The entire city is part of the Oconee River watershed.

Demographics

As of the census of 2000, there were 707 people, 260 households, and 197 families residing in the city. The racial makeup of the city was 60.40% White, 38.33% African American, 0.85% Asian, and 0.42% from two or more races. Hispanic or Latino of any race were 0.71% of the population.

There were 260 households, out of which 34.6% had children under the age of 18 living with them, 50.4% were married couples living together, 21.9% had a female householder with no husband present, and 24.2% were non-families. 22.7% of all households were made up of individuals, and 11.9% had someone living alone who was 65 years of age or older.  The average household size was 2.72 and the average family size was 3.19.

In the city, the population was spread out, with 27.4% under the age of 18, 9.8% from 18 to 24, 25.3% from 25 to 44, 23.2% from 45 to 64, and 14.3% who were 65 years of age or older.  The median age was 36 years. For every 100 females, there were 79.0 males.  For every 100 females age 18 and over, there were 72.1 males.

The median income for a household in the city was $35,156, and the median income for a family was $38,875. Males had a median income of $37,750 versus $22,813 for females. The per capita income for the city was $17,732.  About 9.9% of families and 9.6% of the population were below the poverty line, including 15.6% of those under age 18 and 0.9% of those age 65 or over.

Economy
Rutledge is a part of the Covington movie industry.

References

External links

Rutledge Tourism and Community website

Cities in Georgia (U.S. state)
Cities in Morgan County, Georgia